El Amiria  is a town and commune in Oum El Bouaghi Province, Algeria. According to the 1998 census it has a population of 9795.

Localities  of the commune 
The commune is composed of 29 localities:

References

Communes of Oum El Bouaghi Province